This is a list of equipment used by the Azerbaijani Land Forces.

Infantry weapons

Pistols and submachine guns

Assault rifles

Light machine guns and heavy machine guns

Bayonet

Sniper rifles

Hand grenades and explosives

Grenade launchers

(Anti-tank) Guided Missiles

Anti-tank rockets

Hand-held anti-aircraft missiles

Target acquisition systems and Thermal/IR optic observation systems

Vehicles

Main battle tanks

Infantry fighting vehicles

Armored personnel carriers

Light armored cars

Light vehicles

Military transportation trucks

Engineering and fortification vehicles

RADAR and field communication systems

Ground RADAR systems

Ground-based Air-surveillance RADAR systems

Field mobile radio and satellite communication systems

Anti-unmanned combat aerial vehicle, unmanned aerial vehicle and aircraft missile and surface-to-air missiles

Artillery

Mortars

References

Military equipment of Azerbaijan
Azerbaijan-related lists
Azerbaijani Land Forces